Allied means joined as allies.

Allied may also refer to:
 Allied (automobile), car
 Allied Stores, American department store chain
 Allied Carpets, British retailer
 Allied Commission, governance system set up after World War II
 Allied (film), 2016 romantic thriller film

See also 
 Allie (disambiguation)
 Ally (disambiguation)
 Allied Forces (disambiguation)
 Allied Powers (disambiguation)
 Allies (disambiguation)